In enzymology, an L-lactate dehydrogenase (cytochrome) (EC number 1.1.2.3) is an enzyme that catalyzes the chemical reaction

(S)-lactate + 2 ferricytochrome c  pyruvate + 2 ferrocytochrome c

Thus, the two substrates of this enzyme are (S)-lactate and ferricytochrome c, whereas its two products are pyruvate and ferrocytochrome c.

References

Further reading 

 
 
 

EC 1.1.2
Flavoproteins
Enzymes of unknown structure